= Autovía A-330 =

Highway in Spain

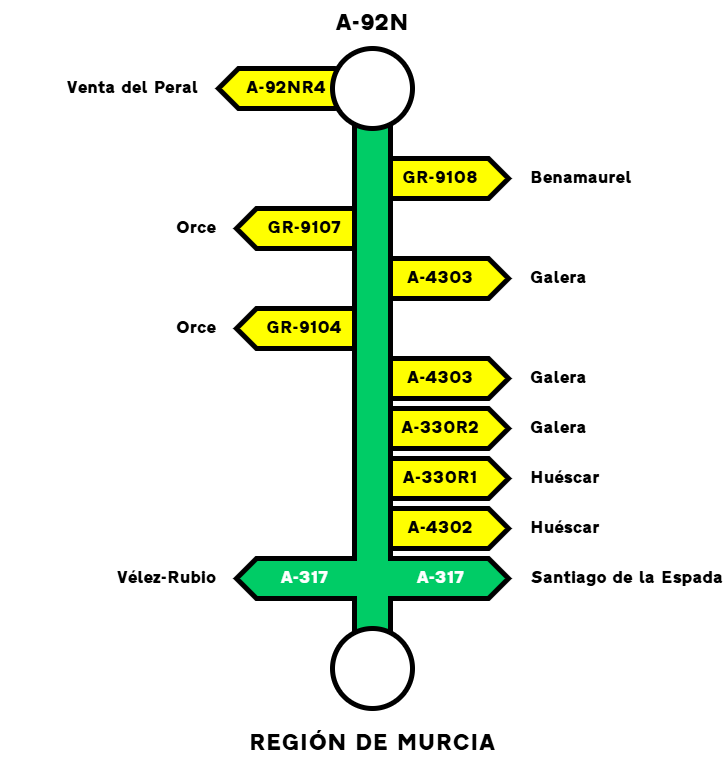
A-330 route

The Autovía A-330 is a highway in Spain. It passes through Andalusia.
